Josua Vici (born 20 February 1994) is a Fijian professional rugby union player. He plays as a winger for the US Colomiers in Pro D2
having previously played for the Houston SaberCats in Major League Rugby and previously for the Fiji 7s team internationally.

References

1994 births
Living people
Expatriate rugby union players in the United States
Fijian expatriate rugby union players
Fijian expatriate sportspeople in the United States
Houston SaberCats players
People from Kadavu Province
Rugby union centres
Rugby union wings